Lars Brøgger (born 22 March 1970) is a Danish former professional footballer who played as a midfielder.

Career
Brøgger made his debut in the Danish Superliga as part of Boldklubben Frem on 28 April 1991 in a 1–0 win over Ikast FS. He scored a hat-trick in the on 28 July 1991 in a match against OB.

References

1970 births
Living people
Danish men's footballers
Boldklubben Frem players
Fortuna Düsseldorf players
Odense Boldklub players
FC Dordrecht players
Ikast FS players
Silkeborg IF players
Fremad Amager players
AB Tårnby players
Danish Superliga players
Bundesliga players
2. Bundesliga players
Eredivisie players
Danish expatriate men's footballers
Expatriate footballers in Germany
Danish expatriate sportspeople in Germany
Expatriate footballers in the Netherlands
Danish expatriate sportspeople in the Netherlands
Association football midfielders
Footballers from Copenhagen